John Frederick Mogg, Baron Mogg  (5 October 1943) is a previous Chairman of Ofgem and the current Chairman of the EU Energy Regulators. It was announced that he would become a life peer on 18 April 2008, and on 28 May 2008 he was created Baron Mogg, of Queen's Park in the county of East Sussex.
On 14 January 2019 he retired from the House of Lords.

Professional life

Mogg spent half of his career in the Civil Service, particularly with regards to industry and European issues. He also served with the European Commission, reaching the grade of Director-General with responsibility for the Internal Market and Financial Services. Mogg is currently Chair of the Board of Governors at Brighton College.

He was appointed a Knight Commander of the Order of St Michael and St George (KCMG) in 2003.

In his previous role as chairman of energy regulator Ofgem (a three-day-a-week job), he received £214,999 a year salary, as revealed to the public in July 2010.

Titles

 Mr John Mogg (1943–2003)
 Sir John Mogg KCMG (2003–2008)
 The Rt. Hon. The Lord Mogg KCMG (2008–)

References

1943 births
Crossbench life peers
Knights Commander of the Order of St Michael and St George
Living people
People's peers
Life peers created by Elizabeth II